This is a list of diplomatic missions of France, excluding honorary consulates. France's permanent representation abroad began in the reign of Francis I, when in 1522 he sent a delegation to the Swiss. Despite its reduced presence following decolonization, France still has substantial influence throughout the world. France has one of the world's largest diplomatic networks and is a member of more multilateral organisations than any other country.

Africa

 Algiers (Embassy)
 Annaba (Consulate-General)
 Oran (Consulate-General)

 Luanda (Embassy)

 Cotonou (Embassy)

 Gaborone (Embassy)

 Ouagadougou (Embassy)

 Bujumbura (Embassy)

 Yaoundé (Embassy)
 Douala (Consulate-General)

 Praia (Embassy)

 Bangui (Embassy)

 N'Djamena (Embassy)

 Moroni (Embassy)

 Brazzaville (Embassy)
 Pointe Noire (Consulate-General)

 Kinshasa (Embassy)

 Djibouti (Embassy)

 Cairo (Embassy)
 Alexandria (Consulate-General)

 Malabo (Embassy)

 Asmara (Embassy)

 Addis Ababa (Embassy)

 Libreville (Embassy)

 Banjul (Embassy Office)

 Accra (Embassy)

 Conakry (Embassy)

 Bissau (Embassy)

 Abidjan (Embassy)

 Nairobi (Embassy)

 Monrovia (Embassy) 

 Tripoli (Embassy)

 Antananarivo (Embassy)
 Antsiranana (Consular Office)
 Mahajanga (Consular Office)
 Toamasina (Consular Office)

 Bamako (Embassy)

 Nouakchott (Embassy)

 Port Louis (Embassy)

 Rabat (Embassy)
 Agadir (Consulate-General)
 Casablanca (Consulate-General)
 Fez (Consulate-General)
 Marrakesh (Consulate-General)
 Tangier (Consulate-General)

 Maputo (Embassy)

 Windhoek (Embassy)

 Niamey (Embassy)

 Abuja (Embassy)
 Lagos (Consulate-General)

 Kigali (Embassy)

 Dakar (Embassy)

 Victoria (Embassy)

 Pretoria (Embassy)
 Cape Town (Consulate-General)
 Johannesburg (Consulate-General)

Juba (Embassy) 

 Khartoum (Embassy)

 Dar es Salaam (Embassy)

 Lomé (Embassy)

 Tunis (Embassy)

 Kampala (Embassy)

 Lusaka (Embassy)

 Harare (Embassy)

Americas

 Buenos Aires (Embassy)

 La Paz (Embassy)

 Brasília (Embassy)
 Rio de Janeiro (Consulate-General)
 São Paulo (Consulate-General)
 Recife (Consulate)

 Ottawa (Embassy)
 Moncton (Consulate-General)
 Montreal (Consulate-General)
 Quebec City (Consulate-General)
 Toronto (Consulate-General)
 Vancouver (Consulate-General)

 Santiago de Chile (Embassy)

 Bogotá (Embassy)

 San José (Embassy)

 Havana (Embassy)

 Santo Domingo (Embassy)

 Quito (Embassy)

 San Salvador (Embassy)

 Guatemala City (Embassy)

 Port-au-Prince (Embassy)

 Tegucigalpa (Embassy)

 Kingston (Embassy)

 Mexico City (Embassy)
 Monterrey (Consulate-General)

 Managua (Embassy)

 Panama City (Embassy)

 Asunción (Embassy)

 Lima (Embassy)

 Castries (Embassy)

 Paramaribo (Embassy)

 Port of Spain (Embassy)

 Washington, D.C. (Embassy)
 Atlanta (Consulate-General)
 Boston (Consulate-General)
 Chicago (Consulate-General)
 Houston (Consulate-General)
 Los Angeles (Consulate-General)
 Miami (Consulate-General)
 New Orleans (Consulate-General)
 New York City (Consulate-General)
 San Francisco (Consulate-General)

 Montevideo (Embassy)

 Caracas (Embassy)

Asia

 Yerevan (Embassy)

 Baku (Embassy)

 Manama (Embassy)

 Dhaka (Embassy)

 Bandar Seri Begawan (Embassy)

 Phnom Penh (Embassy)

 Beijing (Embassy)
 Chengdu (Consulate-General)
 Guangzhou (Consulate-General)
 Hong Kong (Consulate-General)
 Shanghai (Consulate-General)
 Shenyang (Consulate-General)
 Wuhan (Consulate-General)

 Tbilisi (Embassy)

 New Delhi (Embassy)
 Bangalore (Consulate-General)
 Kolkata (Consulate-General)
 Mumbai (Consulate-General)
 Pondicherry (Consulate-General)

 Jakarta (Embassy)

 Tehran (Embassy)

 Baghdad (Embassy)
 Erbil (Consulate-General)

 Tel Aviv (Embassy)
 Haifa (Consulate-General)

 Tokyo (Embassy)
 Kyoto (Consulate-General)

 Amman (Embassy)

 Astana (Embassy)

 Kuwait City (Embassy)

 Bishkek (Embassy)

 Vientiane (Embassy)

 Beirut (Embassy)

 Kuala Lumpur (Embassy)

 Ulaanbaatar (Embassy)

 Yangon (Embassy)

 Kathmandu (Embassy)

 Muscat (Embassy)

 Islamabad (Embassy)
 Karachi (Consulate-General)
 
 Jerusalem (Consulate-General)

 Manila (Embassy)

 Doha (Embassy)

 Riyadh (Embassy)
 Jeddah (Consulate-General)

 Singapore (Embassy)

 Seoul (Embassy)

 Colombo (Embassy)

 Taipei (French Office in Taipei)

 Dushanbe (Embassy)

 Bangkok (Embassy)

 Ankara (Embassy)
 Istanbul (Consulate-General)

 Ashgabat (Embassy)

 Abu Dhabi (Embassy)
 Dubai (Consulate-General)

 Tashkent (Embassy)

 Hanoi (Embassy)
 Ho Chi Minh City (Consulate-General)

Europe

 Tirana (Embassy)

 Andorra la Vella (Embassy)

 Vienna (Embassy)

 Minsk (Embassy)

 Brussels (Embassy)

 Sarajevo (Embassy)

 Sofia (Embassy)

 Zagreb (Embassy)

 Nicosia (Embassy)

 Prague (Embassy)

 Copenhagen (Embassy)

 Tallinn (Embassy)

 Helsinki (Embassy)

 Berlin (Embassy)
 Düsseldorf (Consulate-General)
 Frankfurt (Consulate-General)
 Hamburg (Consulate-General)
 Munich (Consulate-General)
 Saarbrücken (Consulate-General)
 Stuttgart (Consulate-General)

 Athens (Embassy)
 Thessaloniki (Consulate-General)

 Rome (Embassy)

 Budapest (Embassy)

 Reykjavík (Embassy)

 Dublin (Embassy)

 Rome (Embassy)
 Milan (Consulate-General)
 Naples (Consulate-General)

 Pristina (Embassy)

 Riga (Embassy)

 Vilnius (Embassy)

 Luxembourg (Embassy)

 Valletta (Embassy)

 Chişinău (Embassy)

 Monaco (Embassy)

 Podgorica (Embassy)

 The Hague (Embassy)
 Amsterdam (Consulate-General)

 Skopje (Embassy)

 Oslo (Embassy)

 Warsaw (Embassy)
 Kraków (Consulate-General)

 Lisbon (Embassy)

 Bucharest (Embassy)

 Moscow (Embassy)
 Saint Petersburg (Consulate-General)
 Yekaterinburg (Consulate-General)

 Belgrade (Embassy)

 Bratislava (Embassy)

 Ljubljana (Embassy)

 Madrid (Embassy)
 Barcelona (Consulate General)
 Bilbao (Consulate General)

 Stockholm (Embassy)

 Bern (Embassy)
 Geneva (Consulate-General)
 Zürich (Consulate-General)

 Kyiv (Embassy)

 London (Embassy)
 Edinburgh (Consulate-General)

Oceania

 Canberra (Embassy)
 Sydney (Consulate-General)

 Suva (Embassy)

 Wellington (Embassy)

 Port Moresby (Embassy)

 Port Vila (Embassy)

Non-resident embassies
 (San Salvador)
 (New Delhi)
 (Pretoria)
 (Paramaribo)
 (Pretoria)
 (Lusaka)
 (Conakry)
 (Nairobi)
 (Libreville)
 (Jakarta)

Embassies to open

Multilateral organisations
 Addis Ababa (delegation to the African Union)
 Bangkok (permanent delegation to the United Nations Economic and Social Commission for Asia and the Pacific)
 Brussels (permanent representation to the European Union)
 Brussels (permanent representation to North Atlantic Security Organisation)
 Geneva (permanent representation to the United Nations and other international organisations)
 Geneva (permanent representation to the Conference on Disarmament)
 Geneva (permanent delegation to the World Trade Organization)
 London (permanent representation to the International Maritime Organization)
 Lefkoşa (Cultural office to North Cyprus)
 Montreal (representation to the International Civil Aviation Organization)
 Nairobi (permanent representation to the United Nations and other international organisations)
 Nouméa (permanent delegation to the South Pacific Commission)
 New York City (permanent representation to the United Nations)
 Paris (permanent representation to the Organisation of Economic Co-operation and Development)
 Paris (permanent representation to United Nations Educational, Scientific and Cultural Organisation)
 Rome (delegation to the Food and Agriculture Organization)
 Strasbourg (permanent representation to the Council of Europe)
 The Hague (permanent representation to the OPCW (Organisation for the Prohibition of Chemical Weapons))
 Vienna (representation to the United Nations and other international organisations)
 Washington, D.C. (permanent delegation to the Organisation of American States)
 Washington, D.C. (permanent delegation to the Economic Commission for Latin America and the Caribbean)
 Washington, D.C. (delegation to the International Monetary Fund)
 Washington, D.C. (delegation to the International Bank of Reconstruction and Development)

Closed missions

Africa

Americas

Asia

Europe

See also
 Foreign relations of France

Notes

References

External links

French Ministry of Foreign Affairs

 
France
Diplomatic missions